Ungarala Rambabu is a Telugu film written and directed by Kranthi Madhav and produced by Paruchuri Kiriti. It features Sunil, Miya and Prakash Raj in the lead roles. The film was released worldwide on 15 September 2017.

Plot
Ram Babu (Sunil) is a rich man who loses everything after his grand father’s death. Left with no choice, he visits Badam Baba (Posani Krishna Murali) for some solace. Upon his suggestion, Ram Babu goes to a barren land and starts planting a tree. To his luck, he finds gold biscuits worth 200 crores and he, once again becomes rich.
This incident makes him a strong believer in astrology. But as time passes, he starts incurring losses in his business. Once again, the baba asks him to marry a certain girl (Miya George) in his office to become safe in life. The twist is the tale arises when Ram Babu is pit against the girl’s dad (Prakash Raj) who is a communist in nature. Rest of the story is as to how Ram Babu wins his love and becomes successful in life.

Cast

Soundtrack

Reviews

Times of India gave the film 3 out of 5 stars stating, "Ungarala Rambabu' is a laugh-all-the-way fare". Likewise, Indiaglitz gave 2 stars saying, "The film hinges on a formulaic story line that throws up cardboard characters and vacuous, done-to-death situations."

References

2017 films
2010s Telugu-language films
Indian comedy films
Films scored by Mohamaad Ghibran
2017 comedy films